Montaud is a commune in the Hérault department in the Occitanie region in southern France.

Montaud is a mountain village with a dozen hamlets. It contains a school, a city hall, a church, and a few farms.  Most inhabitants of Montaud work in nearby Montpellier, many as researchers, teachers, engineers and technicians.

History
French Cardinal, Bertrand Pierre (Cardinal de Colombier), who was used by the popes at Avignon for agent in wartime missions during the Hundred Years War and in the election of Charles of Bohemia to the imperial throne, died in Montaud in 1361.

Montaud is located in the north of the Vercors, an important site of the French Resistance during World War II.
(Montaud located in the Vercors is another village "montaud 38")
Children from the primary school of Montaud participated in a "spacetalk" via ARISS radio contact with astronaut Mike Finckle, aboard the International Space Station in 2004.

Population

See also
Communes of the Hérault department

References

Communes of Hérault